The 2013–14 Navy Midshipmen men's basketball team represented the United States Naval Academy during the 2013–14 NCAA Division I men's basketball season. The Midshipmen, led by third year head coach Ed DeChellis, played their home games at Alumni Hall and were members of the Patriot League. They finished the season 9–21, 4–14 in Patriot League play to finish in last place. The lost in the first round of the Patriot League tournament to Colgate.

Roster

Schedule

|-
!colspan=9 style="background:#00005D; color:#D4AF37;"| Regular season

|-
!colspan=9 style="background:#00005D; color:#D4AF37;"| 2014 Patriot League tournament

References

Navy Midshipmen men's basketball seasons
Navy
Navy
Navy